The Third Tunisia Plan was an economic development plan implemented by the government of President Habib Bourguiba from 1969 to 1972.

The plan marks the first time Tunisia invested more in industry, 31.7% of the government's budget, than in agriculture, 14.8%.

See also
 Economy of Tunisia
 Fourth Tunisia Plan
 Ninth Tunisia Plan

References

Economic history of Tunisia